Wet electrons in chemistry and physics, which occur on the surface of metal oxides, are a transition state for electrons between the solid and liquid states of matter. Wet electrons are attracted to positively charged hydroxide ions which form on oxide surfaces in the presence of atmospheric moisture. These electrons in turn affect the interaction of other materials with the oxide.

Hydrogen atoms on water or hydroxide (OH) can be involved in hydrogen bonds or be dangling.  Wet electrons are primarily stabilized by the dangling atoms on OH, which is more acidic than water, but the dangling atoms on water also contribute to the stabilization. The process is akin to following the lowest elevation path between valleys with a mountain between them. The minimum energy necessary to change an electron from the solid to the liquid state corresponds to going through the wet electron state.  Wet electrons are a transition state (saddle point) between electrons in the liquid and solid states.

References

Electron states